The Lares Limestone is a geologic formation in Puerto Rico. It preserves fossils dating back to the Late Oligocene to Early Miocene period.

Fossil content 
 Callistosiren

See also 
 List of fossiliferous stratigraphic units in Puerto Rico

References

Further reading 
 W. A. van den Bold. 1965. Middle Tertiary Ostracoda from northwestern Puerto Rico. Micropaleontology 11(4):381-414
 C. J. Maury. 1920. Tertiary Mollusca from Porto Rico. Scientific Survey of Porto Rico and the Virgin Islands 3(1):1-78
 R. D. E. MacPhee and A. R. Wyss. 1990. Oligo-Miocene vertebrates from Puerto Rico, with a catalog of localities. American Museum Novitates 2965:1-45
 J. Vélez Juarbe, T. Martin, R. D. MacPhee and D. Ortega Ariza. 2014. The earliest Caribbean rodents: Oligocene caviomorphs from Puerto Rico. Journal of Vertebrate Paleontology 34(1):157-163
 J. Vélez Juarbe and D. P. Domning. 2011. A new dugongine (Sirenia; Dugongidae) from the Late Oligocene of Puerto Rico and its position within the Dugonginae. Sixth Triennial Conference on Secondary Adaptation of Tetrapods to Life in Water 77

Geologic formations of Puerto Rico
Paleogene Puerto Rico
Paleontology in the Caribbean
Limestone formations
Marl formations
Shallow marine deposits
Lagoonal deposits